Lieutenant-Colonel Sir Roland Vaughan Gwynne DSO, DL, JP (16 May 188215 November 1971) was a British soldier and politician who served as Mayor of Eastbourne, Sussex, from 1928 to 1931. He was also a patient, close friend, and probable lover of the suspected serial killer Dr John Bodkin Adams.

Childhood
Gwynne's father made a fortune in the nineteenth century from an engineering business, Gwynnes Limited, and bought estates in Sussex with the proceeds. Gwynne's mother, May, was 41 when he was born. He was the last of nine children (though two had died). Until the age of 13, he was dressed by his mother as a girl in frocks, with bows, necklaces and long ringlets. He was educated privately before being sent to Trinity Hall, Cambridge.

The renowned harpsichordist Violet Gordon-Woodhouse was one of his sisters. One brother, Rupert, was Member of Parliament for Eastbourne from 1910 until his death in 1924; the celebrated cookery writer Elizabeth David was a daughter of Rupert.

His mother's great-grandfather was Dutch and great-grandmother was a Sumatran.

Career
After university he served in the honorary post of Judge's Marshal. On 2 April 1904 he was commissioned to Second Lieutenant in the Sussex Yeomanry and made Lieutenant on 1 April 1908. In 1904 Gwynne aided Viscount Turnour in his maiden election campaign in the constituency of Horsham, which Turnour then held for the next 47 years. In 1910 Gwynne was called to the Bar at the Inner Temple, where he practised in the Probate and Divorce Division.

The First World War broke out when Gwynne was 32. He was sent a white feather, a symbol of cowardice, by a "friend of the family" and in September 1916 he volunteered for active service. He won the Distinguished Service Order in Flanders in 1917 while attached to the Queen's Royal Regiment, much to the surprise of his family. He was wounded twice, leaving him with a permanent limp.

On 8 April 1921, he was made a Deputy Lieutenant of Sussex. In 1922, his mother died, leaving most of her money to Gwynne due to a family disagreement. That same year, Gwynne put his name forward as a Conservative candidate for Lewes, but withdrew it when his brother Neville hinted to the selection committee that Gwynne was a homosexual (around this time MP Noel Pemberton Billing was leading a witch hunt against homosexuals). John Bodkin Adams arrived in Eastbourne that same year.

Rupert died in 1924, just after being re-elected to Parliament. Gwynne inherited his estate, but settled for local politics, being High Sheriff of Sussex in 1926/27 and then mayor of Eastbourne in 1928. While he was mayor, in 1929 the town bought  of land surrounding Beachy Head, to save it from development, costing the town around £100,000.

His term as mayor ended in 1931. On 9 November that year, he was made the 8th ever Honorary Freeman of Eastbourne for his services to the borough. He stayed in local politics, being Chairman of the East Sussex County Council from 1937 to 1940.

He constantly had financial problems, caused on the one hand by his extravagant lifestyle (he was famous for the wild parties he held at Folkington Manor, attended by, among others, The 1st Marquess of Willingdon, who had previously served as both Governor General of Canada and Viceroy of India, and Rudyard Kipling) and on the other, by his sexuality, which made him a prime target for blackmail. Indeed, his butler Wilde was known by those close to him to be one such person extorting money from him. After Gwynne's death, love letters from various local jockeys were found among his papers.

During the Second World War, he became addicted to alcohol.

In 1947, burdened with debt, he was forced to rent out Folkington and move into the smaller Wootton Manor.

John Bodkin Adams
Gwynne never married but he developed a close friendship with Dr John Bodkin Adams, an unmarried Eastbourne general practitioner and suspected serial killer, with whom he went on frequent shooting holidays to Scotland and Ireland. He would visit Adams every morning at 9 a.m.

During the police investigation into Adams, a note written by a journalist was uncovered, linking Adams sexually to a member of the local police and a local magistrate. The police officer is strongly suspected to have been the Deputy Chief Constable of Eastbourne, Alexander Seekings, and the magistrate to have been Gwynne. Despite the illegality of homosexual sex in the 1950s, the matter was not investigated further by police.

In 1956, Adams was arrested on suspicion of murdering two of his patients. At that time Gwynne was Chairman of the Magistrates in Lewes, East Sussex, and had to step down from the committal hearing owing to a conflict of interest.

On 12 February 1957, just before Adams' trial began, Gwynne was knighted.

During the proceedings, though, Colonel Gwynne was seen dining with Lord Goddard, the Lord Chief Justice, and Sir Hartley Shawcross, a former Attorney General, at a hotel in Lewes. Lord Goddard had by then already appointed the judge for Adams' case, Sir Patrick Devlin.

After their meeting at the hotel Gwynne crashed his car while driving home. No evidence was adduced he had been drinking. The meeting was seen by one of the investigating officers from Scotland Yard, Charles Hewett, as further indication that the Adams' trial was the subject of concerted judicial and political interference.

During the trial, while the jury was out considering the verdict on Adams' first charge of murder, Lord Goddard phoned Devlin to urge him, if Adams was found not guilty, to grant him bail before he was tried on a second count of murder. That surprised Devlin because, in British legal history, a person accused of murder had never been given bail.

A month after the trial on 10 May 1957, Goddard heard a contempt of court case against magazine Newsweek and the shop chain W. H. Smith & Son, which on 1 April during Adams' trial had respectively published and distributed an issue of the magazine containing two paragraphs of material "highly prejudicial to the accused", saying that Adams' victim count could be "as high as 400". Each company was fined £50.

Adams was sensationally acquitted of one murder charge, with a second charge being controversially withdrawn by the Attorney General.

Gwynne's relationship with Adams cooled and, when interviewed by police in connection with the investigation into Adams, he admitted that he had given instructions to be buried in a lead-lined coffin. That unusual procedure was usually designed to protect the water table from contamination or to preserve evidence in case an exhumation might be necessary.

Post Adams
Gwynne fell into depression and in 1963 suffered a stroke. He was admitted to Berrow Nursing and Convalescent Home in Eastbourne in March 1964, having executed a Power of Attorney allowing Sir Dingwall Bateson to take control of his financial and property affairs. After Bateson's death in 1967, Gwynne's solicitors applied to the Court of Protection for the appointment of a Receiver to take over from Bateson. No family members were able or willing to take on the role, and so the Official Solicitor was appointed. According to Gwynne's doctor, he was unable to manage his own affairs due to 'Senile dementia with arteriosclerosis'.

He died on 15 November 1971, in the nursing home, aged 89. His death certificate was signed by Adams. His last will left his estate, valued at around £1.7 million, to the late Bateson.

References

Mayors of places in East Sussex
1882 births
1971 deaths
Alumni of Trinity Hall, Cambridge
Queen's Royal Regiment officers
Sussex Yeomanry officers
British Army personnel of World War I
English people of Indonesian descent
English people of Dutch descent
Companions of the Distinguished Service Order
Gay politicians
History of Eastbourne
Members of the Inner Temple
High Sheriffs of Sussex
English LGBT politicians
English justices of the peace
Deputy Lieutenants of Sussex
Knights Bachelor
Gwynne family